WSTX (970 AM) is a commercial AM radio station licensed to Christiansted, U.S. Virgin Islands.  It airs a radio format of talk shows by day, with Calypso and Quelbe music at night.  Many of the talk shows are hosted by community leaders and elected officials, who are on the station once a week.  On Sunday, religious shows and urban gospel music are heard.

The station is owned by Caledonia Communication Corporation, a corporation whose majority shareholder, Kevin A. Rames, is an attorney based on St. Croix, U.S. Virgin Islands.  Caledonia Communication Corporation purchased the radio station from Family Broadcasting, Inc. on November 19, 2010.  The station owns and utilizes the tradename "The Most Powerful Voice in Talk".

By day, WSTX is powered at 5,000 watts.  But at night, to protect other stations on 970 AM, it reduces power to 1,000 watts.  It uses a non-directional antenna at all times.  WSTX has been assigned these call letters by the Federal Communications Commission since it was initially licensed.

References

External links
 WSTX official website

STX
News and talk radio stations in insular areas of the United States
Radio stations established in 1971
1971 establishments in the United States Virgin Islands
Saint Croix, U.S. Virgin Islands
Reggae, soca and calypso radio stations